Akbarabad-e Bala (also Romanized as Akbarābād-e Bālā) is a village in Kelarestaq-e Sharqi Rural District, in the Central District of Chalus County, Mazandaran Province, Iran. At the 2006 census, its population was 25, in 4 families.

References 

Populated places in Chalus County